Sir Daniel William Lascelles KCMG (19 March 1902 – 17 October 1967) was a British diplomat. He was the British Ambassador in Ethiopia, Afghanistan and Japan.

Early life
Lascelles was the son of the Honourable William Horace Lascelles, eighth son of Henry Lascelles, 4th Earl of Harewood. His mother was Madeline Barton, daughter of Reverend Gerrard Barton. He was educated at The New Beacon, Royal Naval College, Osborne, Isle of Wight; at the Royal Naval College, Dartmouth, Devon; and at Balliol College, Oxford.

Career
After an open competition in 1926, Lescelles earned a position and was subsequently appointed as a Third Secretary in the Diplomatic Service.  In 1931, he was made Second Secretary. and in 1937, he was promoted to First Secretary.
    
In 1945, he was invested as a Companion of the Order of St Michael and St George and he was promoted in the Foreign Office hierarchy.

In 1948, he was appointed Envoy Extraordinary and Minister Plenipotentiary to Addis Ababa and then Consul-General to the Empire of Ethiopia. In 1949–1951, he became Ambassador to Ethiopia.
    
In 1953, he was appointed Ambassador in Kabul, Afghanistan. In 1954, he was invested as Knight Commander of the Order of St Michael and St George.

Lescelles was appointed Ambassador in Tokyo in 1957. He served from 1957 through 1959.

Later life
He died on 17 October 1967 at age 65.

Honours
 Order of St Michael and St George, companion (CMG), 1945.
 Order of St Michael and St George, Knight Commander (KCMG), 1954.

See also
 List of Ambassadors from the United Kingdom to Ethiopia
 List of Ambassadors from the United Kingdom to Afghanistan
 List of Ambassadors from the United Kingdom to Japan
 Anglo-Japanese relations

Notes

References
 Hoare, James. (1999). Embassies in the East: the Story of the British Embassies in Japan, China, and Korea from 1859 to the Present.  Richmond, Surrey: Curzon Press. ;  OCLC 42645589
 Nish, Ian. (2004). British Envoys in Japan 1859-1972. Folkestone, Kent: Global Oriental. ;  OCLC 249167170

Further reading
 Great Britain, Public Record Office. British Foreign Office Files for Post-War Japan (Public Record Office class FO 371). Part 3, Complete files for 1957–1959. ;  OCLC 224083280
 __. British Foreign Office Files for Post-War Japan (Public Record Office class FO 371). Part 4, Complete files for 1960–1962. ;  OCLC 224083430

External links
 UK in Japan,  Chronology of Heads of Mission

1902 births
1967 deaths
Ambassadors of the United Kingdom to Japan
Ambassadors of the United Kingdom to Ethiopia
Ambassadors of the United Kingdom to Afghanistan
Knights Commander of the Order of St Michael and St George
Daniel
People educated at the Royal Naval College, Osborne
20th-century British diplomats